The 2011 Pan American Qualification Tournament for London Olympic Games was held in Querétaro, Mexico from November 18 to November 20, 2011. Each country may enter maximum 2 male and 2 female divisions with only one in each division and the first three ranked athletes per weight division qualify their NOCs a place each for Olympic
Games.

Medalists

Men

Women

Qualification summary

Results

Men

−58 kg
18 November

−68 kg
19 November

−80 kg
20 November

+80 kg
19 November

Women

−49 kg
18 November

−57 kg
19 November

−67 kg
20 November

+67 kg
20 November

References

External links
 World Taekwondo Federation

Olympic Qualification
Taekwondo Olympic Qual
Taekwondo Olympic Qual
Pan American